Anaïs Coraducci (born 6 May 2003) is a Swiss figure skater. On the junior level, she is the 2018 Inge Solar Memorial – Alpen Trophy bronze medalist, and the 2017 Merano Cup bronze medalist.

She qualified for the free skate at the 2019 World Junior Figure Skating Championships.

Competitive highlights 
GP: Grand Prix; CS: Challenger Series; JGP: Junior Grand Prix

Detailed results 
Small medals for short and free programs awarded only at ISU Championships.

Senior results

Junior results

References 

2003 births
Living people
Swiss female single skaters
Figure skaters at the 2020 Winter Youth Olympics
People from Neuchâtel
Sportspeople from the canton of Neuchâtel